Ricardo Ariel Moreira (born February 23, 1983 in Rosario) is an Argentine footballer. He last played for Tiro Federal. He can play either as either a left-back or right-back.

Career 
Moreira started his playing career in 2003 with Rosario Central, he played over 100 games for the club in all competitions before joining Independiente in 2007. On 8 January 2010, Atlético Tucumán signed the Argentine defender from Club Atlético Independiente.

External links
 Argentine Primera statistics
 Football-Lineups player profile

1983 births
Living people
Footballers from Rosario, Santa Fe
Argentine footballers
Association football defenders
Argentine Primera División players
Rosario Central footballers
Club Atlético Independiente footballers
Atlético Tucumán footballers
Club de Gimnasia y Esgrima La Plata footballers